MasterChef India – Telugu (or colloquially MasterChef Telugu) is an Indian Telugu-language competitive cooking reality show based on MasterChef Australia and is part of MasterChef India. Produced by Endemol Shine India and co-produced by Innovative film Academy, it started broadcasting on Gemini TV and Sun NXT on 27 August 2021.

Format 
The show has 14 contestants, a host, and three chefs as judges. The winner of the show will receive the MasterChef title and a cash award of ₹25,00,000.

Series

Season 1

MasterChef India – Telugu 1 was aired from 27 August 2021 to 27 November 2021 on Gemini TV and also available on Sun NXT platform. Tamannaah hosted the initial 16 episodes of the season and Anasuya Bharadwaj hosted episodes 17-24. There was no host present in the remaining episodes. Professional chefs Chalapathi Rao, Sanjay Thumma and Mahesh Padala serve as the judges. K. Krishna Tejasvi, a home baker from Hyderabad won the competition, with G. D. Anusha as the runner-up.

Production

Development 
In early 2021, Sun TV Network secured the production rights of MasterChef in Telugu. In late June 2021, Tamannaah confirmed her role as host of the show, by sharing a behind the scenes picture. The show is planned to have 28 episodes. An entire set designed by Omung Kumar consists of 20 countertops, a pantry and a balcony was created in Innovative Film Academy to shoot the show. The makers chose Multiple-camera setup for the series.

Filming 
The show is directed by Sanjeev K. Kumar and filming began in late June 2021.

Other versions 
MasterChef was initially adapted in Hindi under the name of MasterChef India. Later it was adapted into Tamil as MasterChef India – Tamil. In addition, Kannada and Malayalam adaptations are planned.

References

External links 

 

Indian game shows
2021 Indian television series debuts
Indian cooking television series
Telugu-language television shows
Indian television series based on British television series
MasterChef India
Gemini TV original programming